Joseph John Mathes (July 28, 1891 – December 21, 1978) was an American Major League Baseball infielder. He played for the Philadelphia Athletics during the  season, the St. Louis Terriers during the  season, and the Boston Braves during the  season. He managed in the minor leagues off and on from 1919 through 1934.

References

1891 births
1978 deaths
Baseball players from Milwaukee
Beaumont Exporters players
Beaumont Oilers players
Boston Braves players
Butte Miners players
Chattanooga Lookouts managers
Chicago Cubs scouts
Decatur Commodores players
Detroit Tigers scouts
Houston Buffaloes managers
Houston Buffaloes players
Major League Baseball infielders
Major League Baseball scouts
Philadelphia Athletics players
Portland Colts players
St. Louis Cardinals scouts
St. Louis Terriers players
San Francisco Giants scouts
Sherman Hitters players
Syracuse Stars (minor league baseball) players
Terre Haute Highlanders players
Vernon Tigers players
El Paso Mackmen players